The Carnegie Center for Arts and History is a museum and events venue in downtown Jackson, Tennessee, housed in the former Jackson Free Library.

The Jackson Free Library, which opened in 1903, was the first public library in Jackson. Part of the funding for its construction came from philanthropist Andrew Carnegie. After the Jackson-Madison County Library was built to replace it, the Free Library underwent a period of deterioration that ended in 1987 when the city undertook to restore it. It was listed on the National Register of Historic Places in 1975.

The facility is now a venue for weddings and other special events. The museum in the Carnegie Center features exhibits on the Civil War.

The museum was also formerly known as the Discovery Museum of West Tennessee.

References

External links
 Legends of Tennessee Music Museum

Carnegie libraries in Tennessee
Libraries on the National Register of Historic Places in Tennessee
Renaissance Revival architecture in Tennessee
Buildings and structures completed in 1901
Buildings and structures in Madison County, Tennessee
Museums in Madison County, Tennessee
American Civil War museums in Tennessee
National Register of Historic Places in Madison County, Tennessee